Benjamin Förster (born 14 November 1989) is a German professional footballer who plays as a striker for ZFC Meuselwitz.

Career
Förster came through Chemnitzer FC's youth system, and made his debut in a 2–1 home defeat to SV Babelsberg 03 in October 2008, as a substitute for Jörg Emmerich. Two seasons later helped the club win the Regionalliga Nord title, and promotion to the 3. Liga, finishing as the division's top scorer with 25 goals.

After three years at this level, Förster joined Regionalliga Südwest club SV Elversberg for the 2014–15 season, along with team-mate Thomas Birk.

In summer 2015, Förster signed for Wacker Nordhausen.

After one season with Wacker Nordhausen, Förster moved to Energie Cottbus.

Career statistics

References

External links

1989 births
Living people
Sportspeople from Chemnitz
German footballers
Association football forwards
Chemnitzer FC players
SV Elversberg players
FC Energie Cottbus players
VSG Altglienicke players
Berliner FC Dynamo players
ZFC Meuselwitz players
3. Liga players
Regionalliga players
Footballers from Saxony